Gabriela Matoušková (born 9 August 1992) is a Czech former football forward who last played for Sparta Prague in the Czech Women's First League.

She was a member of the Czech national team. Matoušková made her debut for the national team in a match against Armenia on 19 September 2012.

References

1992 births
Living people
Czech women's footballers
Czech Republic women's international footballers
Sportspeople from Prostějov
Women's association football forwards
AC Sparta Praha (women) players
A.S.D. Pink Sport Time players
Expatriate women's footballers in Italy
Czech expatriate sportspeople in Italy
1. FC Slovácko (women) players
Czech Women's First League players